Bato the Breucian or Bato of the Breuci was the chieftain of the Breuci, an Illyrian tribe that fought against the Roman Empire in a war known as Bellum Batonianum. Bato joined his rebel forces with those led by Bato of the Daesitiates. After facing defeat, he surrendered to Tiberius in 8 AD on the bank of the Bosna river. Ultimately, Bato of the Breuci was captured by Bato of Daesitiates and was put to death after a decision was made by an assembly of the Daesitiates.

See also 
 List of rulers of Illyria

References 

Illyrian royalty
1st-century deaths
Year of birth unknown
1st-century rulers in Europe